Luigi Melieni Mollo (7 June 1943 – 1 August 2021), known professionally as Gino Renni, was an Italian-Argentine actor, comedian and singer.

Biography
Born in Corigliano Calabro, Italy, his career began in 1960. He was known for his role as Gino Foderone in the Explosive Squad and Craziest Bathers in the World movie series.

In 2013, Renni ran for a seat in the Chamber of Deputies in Italy as a member of the Democratic Party but lost the election.

Renni was hospitalized with COVID-19 in June 2021, shortly after getting vaccinated in Buenos Aires. He died two months later on 1 August 2021, from complications caused by the infection, aged 78.

References

External links

1943 births
2021 deaths
People from Corigliano Calabro
Male actors from Buenos Aires
Argentine male film actors
Argentine male television actors
Argentine male stage actors
Argentine male comedians
20th-century Argentine male singers
Democratic Party (Italy) politicians
Italian emigrants to Argentina
Deaths from the COVID-19 pandemic in Argentina